Stadio Simonetta Lamberti is a multi-purpose stadium in Cava de' Tirreni, Italy. The stadium opened in 1969 and holds 5,200 spectators. The pitch is 110× 65metres.

It is currently used, mostly, for football matches and is the home ground of the Cavese 1919.

References 

Simonetta Lamberti
Cava de' Tirreni
Buildings and structures in the Province of Salerno
Cavese 1919